Anthony Leiserowitz is a human geographer at Yale University who studies public perceptions of climate change. He has particularly examined perceptions within the United States, where people are considerably less aware of climate change than in other countries. In the U.S., awareness of information about climate change is heavily influenced by emotion, imagery, associations, and values. Their public discourse reflects a lack of understanding of the science involved in climate change and little awareness of the potential for effective responses to it.

Early life and education 
Sometimes referred to as Tony Leiserowitz, he grew up on a farm in Michigan. His parents were sculptors. He received his undergraduate degree at Michigan State University in 1990 and then moved to Colorado, looking to work as ski bum. While there, he became interested in climate change and went to University of Oregon to study under Paul Slovic, an expert in risk perception. In 2003, Leiserowitz received his Ph.D. in human geography.

Career
He joined the faculty of Yale in 2007. He started to collaborate with Edward Maibach in 2008 to study people's perception of climate change.

As of 2018, he had an appointment as a senior research scientist in the Yale School of Forestry and Environmental Studies  and was director of the Yale Project on Climate Change Communication, a principal investigator at the Center for Research on Environmental Decisions at Columbia University, and a research scientist at Decision Research.

He was the recipient of the Environmental Protection Agency (EPA) 2011 Environmental Merit Award, and as of 2013, he had published approximately 100 scientific articles and book chapters on climate change beliefs, perceptions, and behaviors.

2021 documentary released
In 2021, Leiserowitz announced the creation of a film, Meltdown, that documents a journey he took to Greenland. The documentary was made during his travels to study the effects of climate change on Greenland firsthand. It contains his reactions to the experience and his comments on climate change, which he has been studying for decades. A promotional video appeared on cheddar.com at the end of February 2021.

Selected papers

References

Further reading
 

American geographers
American political scientists
Climate change
Living people
Yale University faculty
University of Oregon alumni
Michigan State University alumni
Year of birth missing (living people)